High 'n' Dry is the second studio album by the English rock band Def Leppard, released on 6 July 1981. High 'n' Dry was Pete Willis' last full-time album with Def Leppard. It charted at No. 38 on the Billboard 200 and No. 26 on the UK Albums Chart. "High 'n' Dry (Saturday Night)", ranked No. 33 on VH1's 40 Greatest Metal Songs. Following the success of Pyromania, the album re-entered in the US chart and reached No. 72 in 1983.

Music
The album's music has been described as heavy metal and hard rock.

Reissue
High 'n' Dry was reissued on 31 May 1984 with two bonus tracks:

"Bringin' On the Heartbreak" (Remix), a similar recording to the 1981 original but with synthesiser and piano overdubs added by Mutt Lange in February 1984. This remix was released later in the year as a single, peaking at No. 61 in the US charts.
"Me & My Wine" (Remix), a remixed version of a 1981 B-side, with the remixed version included as the B-side to the remix of Bringin' on the Heartbreak.

The intention of these remixes was to make the two songs sound more in the style of Def Leppard's 1983 album Pyromania.

Videos for both of the remixed songs were made, featuring Phil Collen (who was not in the band at the time of the album's recording). Both bonus tracks were omitted from the US mid-1990s re-releases of the album, although other countries' releases did include them, but returned when Def Leppard and Mercury came to terms in 2018 and the album was put on digital streaming and downloading platforms.

Reception
Rating the album 4 out of 5, Steve Huey of AllMusic notes how Def Leppard "continues in the vein of the anthemic, working-class hard rock of their debut. While still opting for a controlled musical attack and melodies as big-sounding and stadium-ready as possible, the band opens up its arrangements a bit more on High 'n' Dry, letting the songs breathe and groove while the rhythm section and guitar riffs play off one another."

In a 3.5 out of 5 review, Sputnikmusic writes that "while High 'n' Dry cannot claim to be a resounding success as an individual album, it is indeed one from a progression standpoint. Def Leppard is clearly a more confident outfit here and with help from new producer “Mutt” Lange, they allow their compositions to include greater scope in order for the band to find their sound. While this does result in some misses, they are never too far off target and are more than made up for by the album’s highlights which have aged extremely well."

Track listing

On vinyl and cassette releases, "Me & My Wine" (Remix) is added to the end of side one, while "Bringin' On the Heartbreak" (Remix) leads off side two. On CD releases, "Bringin' On the Heartbreak" (Remix) and "Me & My Wine" (Remix) follow "No No No".
The last lyric, 'no', in "No No No" repeats infinitely on the original vinyl album release. The original cassette features "no" being screamed 46 times and then ending abruptly when the cassette finished. On later releases the "no"s simply fade out.

Personnel

Def Leppard
Joe Elliott – lead vocals
Steve Clark – lead and rhythm guitars
Pete Willis – rhythm and lead guitars
Rick Savage – bass guitar, backing vocals
Rick Allen – drums

Production
Robert John "Mutt" Lange – producer, 1984 remixes
Mike Shipley – engineer
Nigel Green – assistant engineer
Hipgnosis – cover design

Charts

Album

Singles
Let It Go

Bringin' On the Heartbreak

Certifications

See also
List of glam metal albums and songs

References

1981 albums
Def Leppard albums
Albums produced by Robert John "Mutt" Lange
Albums with cover art by Hipgnosis
Vertigo Records albums
Mercury Records albums
New Wave of British Heavy Metal albums
Albums recorded at Morgan Sound Studios